Neu! 2 is the second studio album by the krautrock band Neu!. It was recorded in January 1973 and mixed in February 1973, both at Windrose-Dumont-Time Studios in Hamburg, West Germany, and released in 1973 by Brain Records. It was officially reissued by Astralwerks in the US and by Grönland in the UK and Europe on 29 May 2001. Illegal bootleg CDs (with the audio taken from vinyl) from the Germanofon label were widely available in the late 1990s.

Critic Paul Morley included it in his list of the "5 x 100 Greatest Albums of All Time" in 2003.

Overview 
This album further focused the classic Neu! krautrock sound, with the 11-minute "Für Immer" in particular being the archetypal example of their style -- a forward-driving vamping, propelled by Klaus Dinger's drumming and Michael Rother's layered guitar with its fluid lines and droning harmonic structure. Pitchfork described the album as featuring a proto-punk sound, while Fact labeled it "spartan psych-rock set to power-driven drum tracks."

Side 2 of the record caused consternation at the time. Neu! had quite simply run out of money to finish recording the album, so the second side consists entirely of their previously released single "Neuschnee/Super", manipulated at various playback speeds on a record player, or mangled in a cassette recorder. Critics at the time dismissed this as a cheap gimmick and a rip-off. While it was indeed an experiment born of desperation and necessity, it was entirely in keeping with Neu!'s pop art aesthetics, taking a "ready-made" sound object and re-presenting it with a series of stylized manipulations, and also quite in keeping with the way Neu!'s music deconstructed and pared down the form of rock music. Dinger subsequently pointed to side 2 as being a prototype of the now ubiquitous multiple remixes which typically accompany any pop single release.

Legacy
Ben Sisario of The New York Times described the album along with the band's other early albums as "landmarks of German experimental rock," also referred to by journalists as krautrock.

"Super 16" appears in the films Master of the Flying Guillotine and Kill Bill.

Track listing

Personnel 
Neu!
 Michael Rother – guitar, bass guitar, keyboards, zither, percussion, electronics, cassette recorder
 Klaus Dinger – koto ("Japanese banjo"), 11-string guitar, drums, percussion, Farfisa electronic piano, vocals, electronics, record player

Additional personnel
 Konrad "Conny" Plank – producer, engineer
 Hans Lampe – engineer

References 

1973 albums
Albums produced by Conny Plank
Neu! albums